The M/98 is the standard Norwegian camouflage pattern. It's commonly used in garrison and only rarely used in the field.

History
Introduced around 1998, it is an updated version of the older model M/75, and is used together with different hats according to military branch. The uniform consists of jacket and trousers and comes in the 3-color Norwegian camouflage.

Design
The jacket has two breast pockets and two big hand pockets, both with flap and a sewn on velcro above left breast pocket for the name tag. The trousers have regular pockets for hands - one back pocket and cargo pockets with flap.

The camouflage colors of the uniform consist of DarkOliveGreen (#556B2F), YellowGreen (#9ACD32) and Tan (D2B48C).

A special desert pattern has also been developed for the wars in Afghanistan and Iraq, consisting of light green, brown and dark brown.

Variants

M/03
The M/03 is documented with Norwegian troops operating in arid conditions.

Others
A similar uniform pattern is used by the Democratic Republic of Congo army from an unknown source.

Users

 : Known to be used by the FARDC.
 : Used by the Norwegian Armed Forces.

References

Bibliography
 

Camouflage patterns
Military camouflage
Military equipment introduced in the 1990s